Burn Me Down is a studio album by Canadian singer-songwriter and producer-engineer Inez Jasper. Released on August 1, 2013 on her label Lets'emot, the album blends R&B, First Nations music, pop music, and EDM. The album led to Jasper's second nominations for both the WMCA Aboriginal Recording of the Year and for Juno Award for Aboriginal Album of the Year. At the 2014 Aboriginal People’s
Choice Music Awards, the album was named Best Pop Album and led to Jasper being named Best Producer/Engineer.

Production and release
Her album Burn Me Down was released on August 1, 2013, and like her debut was published through her label Lets'emot Music.  Among the tracks on the album are "The Takeover," featuring Jon C, and "Fallen Soldier" featuring Fawn Wood. Some of the ten dance songs also incorporate samples of Big Phil performing Sto:lo traditional singing.

The track "Dancin' on the Run" had been released prior to the album, in May 2013. According to  Chilliwack Times, the song is about "Canadian government's notorious ban on native potlatch gatherings between 1885 and 1951." A music video for the track was released in July 2013.

Reception

Reviews were largely positive, with a mixed response to the more pop-oriented sound of this album versus her debut. Chilliwack Times described her sound in Burn Me Down as veering "further into upbeat dance-inspired pop." Likewise,  Indian Country Today wrote that in the album "Inez has married her spot-on vocals to the pop genre." The review further described the album as a "35-minute romp through buzzy electronic beats, Casio-inspired clap tracks and suggestive lyrics rife with innuendo." AMMSA wrote that "this is a far more Pop’d out version of Inez than her first soulful offering and her beautiful vocals float over strong danceable beats."

Awards
In February 2014 Burn Me Down was nominated for a Juno Award for Aboriginal Album of the Year. On June 4, 2014, the Western Canadian Music Alliance announced that Inez had been nominated for Aboriginal Recording of the year at the Western Canadian Music Awards. On September 12, 2014 she performed during the live broadcast at the Aboriginal People’s Choice Awards, held in Winnipeg, Manitoba. During the ceremonies she was called onstage and given two awards for her work on Burn Me Down: Best Producer-Engineer, and Best Pop Album.

Track listing

Awards and nominations

Personnel
Inez Jasper - primary artist

References

External links
InezJasper.com
Inez Jasper on YouTube
Inez Jasper on SoundCloud

2013 albums